is a Japanese composer and percussionist.  He frequently works with natural sounds, using water, wood, or stone as musical instruments.

He has performed with his brother Yoshihisa Ochi as the Ochi Brothers, as well as with the American microtonal bassoonist Johnny Reinhard.  He is a member of the Japan Composer's Association (JACOMPA) and has recorded a number of CDs.

External links
Yoshiaki Ochi profile

Year of birth missing (living people)
20th-century classical composers
20th-century Japanese musicians
20th-century Japanese male musicians
21st-century classical composers
21st-century Japanese musicians
21st-century Japanese male musicians
Japanese classical composers
Japanese male classical composers
Japanese percussionists
Living people